Hemiphyllodactylus yanshanensis is a species of gecko. It is endemic to China.

References

Hemiphyllodactylus
Reptiles described in 2022
Endemic fauna of China
Reptiles of China